The Cornwall, at 255 West 90th Street, is a luxury residential cooperative apartment building on the Upper West Side of Manhattan, New York City. Located on the northwest corner of Broadway and 90th Street, it was designed by Neville & Bagge and erected in 1909. The developers were Arlington C. Hall and Harvey M. Hall. The twelve-story brick and stone building is noted for its elaborate balcony and window detail, and the "spectacular" design of its "extraordinary" ornate Art Nouveau cornice, which the AIA Guide to New York City called "a terra-cotta diadem." In 1991, the building's owner-occupants paid $600,000 to have the cornice and ornamented balconies replaced with terra cotta replicas of the originals.

Notable residents include New York Times "Streetscape" columnist and architectural historian Christopher Gray.

References

External links
 New York Public Library: Digital Gallery
 City Review

Residential buildings in Manhattan
Condominiums and housing cooperatives in Manhattan
Art Nouveau architecture in New York City
Upper West Side
Art Nouveau apartment buildings
Residential buildings completed in 1909

Broadway (Manhattan)
1909 establishments in New York City